{{DISPLAYTITLE:C14H12N2}}
The molecular formula C14H12N2 may refer to:

 1-Amino-3-phenylindole, a chemical compound
 
 Neocuproine, a heterocyclic organic compound and chelating agent